Taruffi is an Italian surname. Notable people with the surname include:

 Emilio Taruffi (1633–1696), Italian painter
 Piero Taruffi (1906–1988), Italian racing driver
 Giuseppe Antonio Taruffi (1715–1786), Italian poet and chess master

Italian-language surnames